The name Haikui has been used for two tropical cyclones in the northwestern Pacific Ocean.  The name was contributed by China and literally means "sea anemone". It replaced "Longwang," which was retired after the 2005 typhoon season.

 Typhoon Haikui (2012) (T1211, 12W) – a Category 1 typhoon that made landfall in Zhejiang, China .
 Tropical Storm Haikui (2017) (T1724, 30W, Salome) – a weak storm that traversed the Philippine archipelagos of Luzon and Visayas. 

Pacific typhoon set index articles